Charles MacMahon is the name of:
Charles MacMahon (politician) (1824–1891), Australian politician and Chief Commissioner of Victoria Police
Charles MacMahon (theatre) (1861–1917), Australian theatrical entrepreneur and filmmaker
Members of the MacMahon family
Charles Laure MacMahon, 2nd Marquis de MacMahon (1752–1830)
Charles Marie MacMahon, 3rd Marquis de MacMahon (1793–1845)
Charles Henri MacMahon, 4th Marquis de MacMahon (1828–1863)
Charles Marie MacMahon, 5th Marquis de MacMahon (1856–1894)

See also
Charles McMahon (disambiguation)
Chuck McMann (1951–2021), Canadian football player